The SXSW Gaming Awards were awards given to video games during the annual South by Southwest Festival (SXSW), held in Austin, Texas typically in March of that year. The Awards were part of the SXSW Gaming Expo which is part of the SXSW Interactive branch of the festival.

History
Video games had been part of the SXSW within the SXSW Interactive branch; in 2006, the festival launched "Screenburn" as a special portion of the Interactive branch for video games, and later renamed this to SXSW Gaming in 2013.

Matthew Crump, a veteran game developer, joined SXSW in 2012 and spearheaded the efforts to create the SXSW Gaming Awards to premiere during the 2014 festival. The new awards in fifteen different categories were announced in September 2013 to be awarded during the 2014 festival. However, Crump died from a heart attack just before the festival. The event organizers opted to rename the "Cultural Innovation in Gaming" to the "Matthew Crump Cultural Innovation Award" to honor Crump's contributions to the festival. The Gaming Awards were discontinued by SXSW in 2023 due to a desire to "streamline our festival a bit more."

Format
Developers and publishers must submit their games for consideration to the festival organizers prior to a deadline; these games generally must have had public release in the preceding calendar year to the festival (for example, for the inaugural 2014 awards, games had to be released in 2013). The festival's organizers along with a panel of industry experts review all submissions and select the top five for each of the game categories. These are then opened to public voting for the final winner for each award to be chosen.

The Gamer's Voice awards are exceptional to these: they are limited only to indie games released in the previous calendar year or the current year, and which any member of the public may nominate. The festival organizers select multiple games (typically more than five) after playing through each as nominees for the award. These games are featured in playable form at the SXSW festival to allow attendees to try them before they vote for their favorite.

The awards ceremony is held near the end of the SXSW event, with celebrity and gaming hosts presenting the awards.

The 2020 SXSW event was cancelled in light of the COVID-19 pandemic, but the award winners were still named online on March 24, 2020.

Ceremonies

Awards

Video Game of the Year
This award was named "Game of the Year" in 2014, but was renamed when the Mobile and Tabletop awards were added.
 2014 – The Last of Us, Naughty Dog
 2015 – Dragon Age: Inquisition, BioWare
 2016 – The Witcher 3: Wild Hunt, CD Projekt Red
 2017 – Uncharted 4: A Thief's End, Naughty Dog
 2018 – The Legend of Zelda: Breath of the Wild, Nintendo
 2019 – God of War, Sony Interactive Entertainment
 2020 – Sekiro: Shadows Die Twice, FromSoftware/Activision
 2021 – Hades, Supergiant Games
 2022 – Final Fantasy XIV: Endwalker, Square Enix

Tabletop Game of the Year
 2015 – Star Realms, White Wizard Games
 2016 – Pandemic Legacy, Z-Man Games
 2017 – Arkham Horror: The Card Game, Fantasy Flight Games
 2018 – Gloomhaven, Cephalofair Games
 2019 – Root, Leder Games
 2020 – Paladins of the West Kingdom, Renegade Game Studios
 2021 – The Search for Planet X, Renegade Game Studios
 2022 – Dune: Imperium, Dire Wolf Digital

XR Game of the Year
Formally "VR Game of the Year" prior 2020
 2018 – Resident Evil 7: Biohazard, Capcom
 2019 – Beat Saber, Beat Games
 2020 – No Man's Sky VR, Hello Games
 2021 – Half-Life: Alyx, Valve Corporation
 2022 – Resident Evil IV VR, Armature Studio/Oculus Studios

Indie Game of the Year
 2021 – Deep Rock Galactic, Ghost Ship Games/Coffee Stain Publishing
 2022 – Kena: Bridge of Spirits, Ember Lab

Matthew Crump Cultural Innovation Award
Awarded for a game that challenges the normal idea of video gaming, offering a culturally innovative view of the world
 2014 – Papers, Please, 3909 LLC
 2015 – This War of Mine, 11 bit studios
 2016 – Undertale, tobyfox
 2017 – That Dragon, Cancer, Numinious Games
 2018 – Doki Doki Literature Club!, Team Salvato
 2019 – Celeste, Matt Makes Games
 2020 – Disco Elysium, ZA/UM
 2021 – Dreams, Media Molecule/Sony Interactive Entertainment
 2022 – Unpacking, Witch Beam/Humble Bundle

Excellence in Animation, Art, and Visual Achievement
Combined the three former awards.
 2021 – Ghost of Tsushima, Sucker Punch Productions/Sony Interactive Entertainment
 2022 – Forza Horizon 5, Playground Games/Xbox Game Studios

Excellence in Audio Design
 2021 – Doom Eternal - id Software/Bethesda Softworks
 2022 – Resident Evil Village, Capcom

Excellence in Game Design
Formerly "Excellence in Design and Direction"
 2014 – Tearaway, Media Molecule
 2015 – Middle-earth: Shadow of Mordor, Monolith Productions
 2016 – Bloodborne, FromSoftware
 2017 – Dishonored 2, Arkane Studios
 2018 – The Legend of Zelda: Breath of the Wild, Nintendo
 2019 – God of War, Sony Interactive Entertainment
 2020 – Control, Remedy Entertainment/505 Games
 2021 – Hades, Supergiant Games
 2022 – Inscryption, Daniel Mullins/Devolver Digital

Excellence in Original Score
Formerly "Excellence in Musical Score"
 2014 – The Last of Us, Naughty Dog
 2015 – Transistor, Supergiant Games
 2016 – Ori and the Blind Forest, Moon Studios
 2017 – Doom, id Software
 2018 – Nier: Automata, PlatinumGames
 2019 – Tetris Effect, Enhance, Inc.
 2020 – Death Stranding, Kojima Productions/Sony Interactive Entertainment
 2021 – Ori and the Will of the Wisps, Moon Studios/Xbox Game Studios
 2022 – Final Fantasy XIV: Endwalker, Square Enix

Excellence in Multiplayer
Formally "Best Multiplayer Game" until 2016
 2014 – Super Mario 3D World, Nintendo
 2015 – Super Smash Bros. for Wii U, Nintendo
 2016 – Rocket League, Psyonix
 2017 – Overwatch, Blizzard Entertainment
 2018 – PlayerUnknown's Battlegrounds, PUBG Corp.
 2019 – Fortnite, Epic Games
 2020 – Final Fantasy XIV: Shadowbringers, Square Enix
 2021 – Deep Rock Galactic, Ghost Ship Games/Coffee Stain Publishing
 2022 – It Takes Two, Hazelight Studios/Electronic Arts

Excellence in Narrative
 2014 – The Last of Us, Naughty Dog
 2015 – The Wolf Among Us, Telltale Games
 2016 – The Witcher 3: Wild Hunt, CD Projekt Red
 2017 – Uncharted 4: A Thief's End, Naughty Dog
 2018 – What Remains of Edith Finch, Giant Sparrow
 2019 – Detroit: Become Human, Sony Interactive Entertainment
 2020 – Disco Elysium, ZA/UM
 2021 – The Last of Us Part II, Naughty Dog/Sony Interactive Entertainment
 2022 – Final Fantasy XIV: Endwalker, Square Enix

Excellence in Technical Achievement
 2014 – Grand Theft Auto V, Rockstar Games
 2015 – Destiny, Bungie
 2016 – The Witcher 3: Wild Hunt, CD Projekt Red
 2017 – Battlefield 1, EA DICE
 2018 – Nier: Automata, PlatinumGames
 2019 – Red Dead Redemption 2, Rockstar Games
 2020 – Death Stranding, Kojima Productions/Sony Interactive Entertainment
 2021 – Microsoft Flight Simulator, Asobo Studio/Xbox Game Studios
 2022 – Ratchet & Clank: Rift Apart, Insomniac Games/Sony Interactive Entertainment

Retired awards

Excellence in Animation
 2014 – Ni No Kuni: Wrath of the White Witch, Namco Bandai
 2015 – Middle-earth: Shadow of Mordor, Monolith Productions
 2016 – Rise of the Tomb Raider, Crystal Dynamics
 2017 – Uncharted 4: A Thief's End, Naughty Dog
 2018 – Cuphead, StudioMDHR
 2019 – Marvel's Spider-Man, Sony Interactive Entertainment
 2020 – Kingdom Hearts III – Square Enix

Excellence in Art
 2014 – BioShock Infinite, Irrational Games
 2015 – Child of Light, Ubisoft
 2016 – Bloodborne, FromSoftware
 2017 – Firewatch, Campo Santo
 2018 – Cuphead, StudioMDHR
 2019 – Octopath Traveler, Nintendo
 2020 – The Legend of Zelda: Link's Awakening, Nintendo

Excellence in Gaming Marketing
 2014 – Assassin’s Creed IV: Black Flag, Ubisoft

Excellence in Convergence
Awarded for a game that exemplifies crossover medium appeal. Formally the "Convergence Award" until 2016
 2014 – Injustice: Gods Among Us, Warner Bros. Interactive
 2015 – South Park: The Stick of Truth, Obsidian Entertainment
 2016 – Batman: Arkham Knight, Rocksteady Studios
 2017 – Batman: The Telltale Series, Telltale Games
 2018 – Star Wars Battlefront II, EA DICE
 2019 – Marvel's Spider-Man, Sony Interactive Entertainment

Excellence in Gameplay
 2014 – Brothers: A Tale of Two Sons, 505 Studios
 2015 – Middle-earth: Shadow of Mordor, Monolith Productions
 2016 – Metal Gear Solid V: The Phantom Pain, Kojima Productions
 2017 – Doom, id Software
 2018 – The Legend of Zelda: Breath of the Wild, Nintendo
 2019 – Super Smash Bros. Ultimate, Nintendo
 2020 – Devil May Cry 5, Capcom

Excellence in SFX
 2014 – The Last of Us, Naughty Dog
 2015 – Alien: Isolation, Creative Assembly
 2016 – Star Wars Battlefront, EA DICE
 2017 – Battlefield 1, EA DICE
 2018 – Super Mario Odyssey, Nintendo
 2019 – Red Dead Redemption 2, Rockstar Games
 2020 – Star Wars Jedi: Fallen Order, Respawn Entertainment/Electronic Arts

Excellence in Visual Achievement
 2015 – Far Cry 4, Ubisoft
 2016 – The Order: 1886, Ready at Dawn
 2017 – Uncharted 4: A Thief's End, Naughty Dog
 2018 – Horizon Zero Dawn, Guerrilla Games
 2019 – God of War, Sony Interactive Entertainment
 2020 – Sekiro: Shadows Die Twice, FromSoftware/Activision

Mobile Game of the Year
 2015 – Hearthstone: Heroes of Warcraft, Blizzard Entertainment
 2016 – Her Story, Sam Barlow
 2017 – Pokémon Go, Niantic
 2018 – Fire Emblem Heroes, Nintendo
 2019 – Donut County, Annapurna Interactive
 2020 – Sky: Children of the Light, Thatgamecompany

Most Promising New Intellectual Property
 2016 – Splatoon, Nintendo
 2017 – Overwatch, Blizzard Entertainment
 2018 – Horizon Zero Dawn, Guerrilla Games
 2019 – Beat Saber, Beat Games
 2020 – The Outer Worlds, Obsidian Entertainment/Private Division

Trending Game of the Year
 2017 – Overwatch, Blizzard Entertainment
 2018 – PlayerUnknown's Battlegrounds, PUBG Corp.
 2019 – Red Dead Redemption 2, Rockstar Games
 2020 – Pokémon Sword and Shield, Game Freak/The Pokémon Company, Nintendo

Texas Arts Achievement
Awarded to a Texas-based studio or game
 2014 – Galactic Cafe

Most Valuable Character
 2015 – Ellie, The Last of Us
 2016 – Lara Croft, Rise of the Tomb Raider
 2017 – Nathan Drake, Uncharted 4: A Thief's End, Naughty Dog

Most Promising New Esports Game
Formerly "Esports Game of the Year" until 2019.
 2017 – Overwatch, Blizzard Entertainment
 2018 – PlayerUnknown's Battlegrounds, PUBG Corp.
 2019 – Fortnite, Epic Games

Most Valuable eSports Team
 2015 – Cloud9
 2016 – Evil Geniuses

Most Valuable Online Channel
 2015 – Rooster Teeth

Most Entertaining Online Personality
 2016 – Greg Miller, Kinda Funny

Most Valuable Add-On Content
 2015 – Left Behind, The Last of Us

Most Anticipated Crowdfunded Game
 2015 – Star Citizen

Most Fulfilling Community-Funded Game
Formerly "Most Fulfilling Crowdfunded Game" until 2018.
 2016 – Undertale, tobyfox
 2017 – Starbound, Chucklefish
 2018 – Night in the Woods, Infinite Fall
 2019 – CrossCode, Deck13

Most Evolved Game
 2019 – No Man's Sky Next, Hello Games

Fan Creation of the Year
 2017 – Brutal Doom 64, Sergeant_Mark_IV

Gamer's Voice Award
Award to an indie game voted by the public; split into Single and Multi-player categories in 2016.
 2014 – Nidhogg, Messhof
 2015 – SpeedRunners, DoubleDutch Games

Single Player
 2016 – Superhot, Superhot Team
 2017 – Owlboy, D-Pad Studio

Multiplayer
 2016 – Gang Beasts, Boneloaf
 2017 – Arena Gods, Supertype Games

VR
 2019 – Intruders: Hide & Seek, Tessera Studios

References

External links
 

Video game awards
Culture of Austin, Texas
Awards established in 2014
2014 establishments in Texas